Willows Gemfields is a rural town in the locality of Willows in the Central Highlands Region, Queensland, Australia.

Sapphires are extensively mined.

History 
The town was named on 1 October 1979.

Education 
There are no schools in Willows Gemfields. The nearest primary school is Anakie State School in Anakie to the north-east. The nearest secondary school is Emerald State High School in Emerald to the east.

References

External links
Map and facilities list
A Gemfields homepage

Mining towns in Queensland
Towns in Queensland
Central Highlands Region